Pants on Fire is a 2014 Disney XD Original Movie, starring Bradley Steven Perry, Joshua J. Ballard, Tyrel Jackson Williams and Brittney Wilson. It premiered on November 9, 2014.

Plot
Set in Massachusetts, a 15-year-old named Jack Parker has everything going for him: popularity at school, an easy home life, and a high chance of winning an award that would lead him to be batboy for the Boston Red Sox. There's just one thing; he earned them by being the biggest liar around, but little did he know that that was all going to change. One day while he was giving a speech, Mikey, one of his lies, appears. Progressively, one by one, all his lies start to come to life, starting with two angry lumberjacks and a possessive, jealous girlfriend, Lisa, from Arizona. He and his friend Ryan soon find out from a plush purple hippo from a children's restaurant/fun center that the only way to stop his lies from coming true is to tell the truth. However, Jack refuses to do it, since the award ceremony is coming soon and he doesn't want to lose. After that encounter, they soon come face-to-face with the lumberjacks, along with another one of his lies: two alien agents. They are able to escape with the help of Lisa, but only after he tells her the truth. During this time (and a few more lies later), he learns that his lies hurt those closest to him.

After a conversation with a man practicing his baseball hits (who he later discovers was his baseball hero, Danny Kostas, getting over a slump), he tells everyone at the award ceremony the lies that he told and is disqualified. He and Ryan soon see all of his lies in the hall and run into an empty room where they saw the hippo. After Jack explains to the hippo that he told the truth and none of the lies went away, the hippo reveals itself to be his sister, Hannah, who was fed up with his lies and wanted to teach him a lesson. She reveals that the lies were just actors and other people using special effects, and that they rehearsed the plot for months. They soon reconcile, but Jack's parents arrive and ground him by making him clean the whole garage. In the end, he finishes cleaning up the garage, finishes his punishment and learns his lesson about lying.

He visits Jennifer, whom he has a crush on, to apologize and promises he will never lie again for now. They soon take off in a limo to Fenway Park, compliments of Danny.

Cast
 Bradley Steven Perry as Jack Parker
 Joshua J. Ballard as Ryan
 Tyrel Jackson Williams as Mikey
 Brittney Wilson as Hannah Parker / Hippo
 Taylor Russell as Jennifer
 Nicholas Coombe as Eric
 Rachelle Gillis as Lisa
 Kevin O'Grady as Chip
 John Stewart as Rock
 Jill Teed as Diane Parker
 Peter Graham-Gaudreau as Ed Parker
 Manoj Sood as Principal Kar
 Richard Ian Cox as Otis

Production
By June 2014, Disney XD agreed to a multi-picture development deal with Two 4 the Money Media and MarVista Entertainment with MarVista having global distribution rights. The two companies teamed up for the first time for this TV film.

Broadcast
The film premiered on Disney XD channels in the United States and Canada on November 9, 2014, and in Australia on February 6, 2015.

References

Disney XD original films
2014 television films
2014 films
American television films
American teen comedy films
2010s teen comedy films
American films about revenge
Films set in Massachusetts
2010s American films